Shabudin bin Yahaya (Jawi: شهاب الدين بن يحيى; born 12 November 1965) is a Malaysian politician who has served as Chairman of the Amanah Ikhtiar Malaysia (AIM) since September 2021. He served as Deputy Minister in the Prime Minister's Department in charge of Parliament and Law in the Perikatan Nasional (PN) administration under former Prime Minister Muhyiddin Yassin and former Minister Takiyuddin Hassan from July 2020 to August 2021, Secretary of the Government Backbenchers Club (BBC) from September 2021 to June 2022, Secretary of the PN Government Backbenchers Club (PNBBC) from January 2021 to collapse of the PN government in August 2021, Chairman of the FELCRA Berhad briefly from May 2020 to July 2020, Member of Parliament (MP) for Tasek Gelugor from May 2013 to November 2022 and Member of the Penang State Legislative Assembly (MLA) for Permatang Berangan from March 2004 to May 2013. He is a member of the Malaysian United Indigenous Party (BERSATU), a component party of the PN and formerly Pakatan Harapan (PH) coalitions and was a member of United Malays National Organisation (UMNO), a component party of the Barisan Nasional (BN) coalition. After the defeat of BN to PH in the 2018 general election, he resigned from UMNO in 2018 and joined BERSATU in 2019.

Shabudin is also a former Syariah Court judge. He is notable as he controversially opposed an amendment to be added in the Sexual Offences Against Children Bill 2017 and stated that the people who performed statutory rape are able to marry the victim without any punishment.

Politics

Debate of Sexual Offences Against Children Bill 2017

At about 4:10pm Malaysia Standard Time (UTC+08:00) on 4 April 2017, Teo Nie Ching, a member of parliament for Kulai had proposed for a new amendment (15A) for the Sexual Offences Against Children Bill 2017, stating that child marriage should be banned. She stated that Malaysia had signed a United Nations resolution during October 2013. Malaysia also had signed the Convention on the Elimination of All Forms of Discrimination Against Women (CEDAW) and the 16th article of the treaty writes the freedom to choose a spouse and to enter into marriage only with free and full consent. She emphasised that Malaysian's children cannot have the capacity to have free and full consent because they still cannot smoke cigarette, drive a car and vote until they reached the age of 21.

She later cited that at 30 November 2015, the deputy of the Ministry of Women, Family and Community Development made a statement that the government does not support marriage under 18, the Prime Minister's Department expressed the serious issues of child marriage on 12 April 2016 and the Spouse of the Prime Minister of Malaysia, Rosmah Mansor stated that the Malaysian have the power to increase the minimum age of marriage from 16 to 18.

She also gave out some cases of adults marrying underage children in Malaysia and claimed that the bride divorced soon after and some of their husband is actually a rapist. The chances of them dying is five times higher than a normal adult woman and they cannot continue their studies after marrying. She stated that the other Islamic country like Algeria, Egypt and Morocco's minimum marriage age is 18 years old and asked why Malaysia cannot be the same as theirs.

Retirement
On 19 June 2022, he had announced that he will retire from politics to give way for young people.

Election results

Honours
  :
  Companion Class II of the Order of Malacca (DPSM) – Datuk (2013)

See also

 Tasek Gelugor (federal constituency)

References
 

1965 births
Living people
People from Penang
Malaysian people of Malay descent
Malaysian Muslims
21st-century Malaysian judges
Malaysian United Indigenous Party politicians
Former United Malays National Organisation politicians
Independent politicians in Malaysia
Members of the Dewan Rakyat
Members of the Penang State Legislative Assembly
21st-century Malaysian politicians